25th Brigade or 25th Infantry Brigade may refer to:

Australia
 25th Brigade (Australia)

Canada
 25th Canadian Infantry Brigade

Greece
 25th Armored Brigade (Greece)

India
 25th Indian Infantry Brigade

Kuwait
 Kuwait 25th Commando Brigade

North Korea
 25th Infantry Brigade (North Korea)

Russia 
 25th Separate Guards Motor Rifle Brigade

Ukraine
 25th Airborne Brigade (Ukraine)

United Kingdom
 25th Armoured Engineer Brigade Royal Engineers
 25th Army Tank Brigade
 25th Infantry Brigade (United Kingdom)
 Artillery Brigades
 25th Brigade Royal Field Artillery

See also
 25th Division
 25th Battalion
 25 Squadron